Alexis Glick (born  Alexis Cahill Donnelly; August 7, 1972) was an American television personality who was an anchor of Money for Breakfast and The Opening Bell on Fox Business, as well as the Vice President of Business News. She left the channel in December 2009. Glick has since founded the GENYOUth Foundation, a nonprofit dedicated to nurturing child health and wellness through improved nutrition and physical activity.

Early life and education
Glick grew up in the private residential development of Stuyvesant Town in Manhattan. Her father, Robert E. Donnelly, is an entertainment lawyer in Manhattan. Her mother, Ellen Cahill Donnelly, was a secretary for Lehman Brothers and is the office manager in Brooklyn for the Forest City Ratner Corporation, a New York real estate developer. Glick's parents live in Dobbs Ferry, New York.

Glick graduated from the Dalton School on the Upper East Side and earned a bachelor's degree in political science from Columbia University.

Career
Glick began her career as an analyst at Goldman Sachs in the Equities Division. She was also an executive at Morgan Stanley where she was in charge of floor operations at the New York Stock Exchange, making her the first and youngest woman to manage such an operation for a bulge bracket firm.

Glick traded consumer and entertainment stocks, utility and real estate investment trusts and most notably, the financials including banks, credit card stocks, government agencies and insurance stocks at Morgan Stanley. She was also one of the top producers on the company's Listed Equity Trading Desk from 1998 through 2001.

NBC News/MSNBC/CNBC
Glick had worked as a temporary host for the third hour of NBC's Today in 2006. She was also a substitute anchor on Early Today in 2005 and an occasional anchor on MSNBC Live. Previously, Glick was a senior business correspondent for CNBC.

Fox News/Fox Business
It was announced on September 12, 2006 that Glick would be joining the Fox News as Director of Business News. Glick began appearing on Fox News programming in July 2007. She has interviewed world leaders such as President Barack Obama, Secretary of the Treasury, former Secretary Of Commerce Gary Locke. Henry Paulson, Canadian Prime Minister Stephen Harper, and former Irish head of state John Bruton.

On December 23, 2009, Glick announced that she was leaving the Fox Business.

Post-Fox
Glick made appearances on the May 7, 2010 episode of "Real Time with Bill Maher" and as a guest commentator on CNN and ABC News. She also guest-hosted on WABC and Sirius XM radio from New York.

Glick is the founder and current CEO of the GENYOUth Foundation, a nonprofit dedicated to nurturing child health and wellness through improved nutrition and physical activity.

Personal life
She is married to Oren Glick, who is Jewish and the founder and president of Shoot Digital, a New York City photography company. They have four children.

Glick has a second home in Watermill, New York in Suffolk County with primary residences in the Gramercy Park and Flatiron neighborhoods of the Manhattan borough in New York City.

References

External links 

 
 
 TVWeek's Hot List 2007
 

Fox Business people
1972 births
Living people
People from Gramercy Park
American reporters and correspondents
American television journalists
Columbia College (New York) alumni
NBC News people
Dalton School alumni
Goldman Sachs people
CNBC people
Morgan Stanley employees
American women business executives
American business executives
Journalists from New York City
Fox News people
American women television journalists
People from the Flatiron District, Manhattan
21st-century American women